Anthony C. Mottola (April 18, 1918 – August 9, 2004) was an American jazz guitarist who released dozens of solo albums. Mottola was born in Kearny, New Jersey and died in Denville.

Career
Like many of his contemporaries, Mottola began learning to play the banjo, but then took up the guitar. He had his first guitar lessons from his father. He toured with an orchestra led by George Hall in 1936, marking the beginning of his professional life. His first recordings were duets with guitarist Carl Kress. In 1945, he collaborated with accordionist John Serry Sr. in a recording of "Leone Jump" for Sonora Records (MS-476-3) which was played in jukeboxes throughout the U.S. His only charted single as a soloist was "This Guy's in Love with You", which reached No. 22 on the Billboard magazine Easy Listening Top 40 in the summer of 1968.

Mottola worked often on television, appearing as a regular on shows hosted by vocalist Perry Como and comedian Sid Caesar and as music director for the 1950s series Danger. From 1958 to 1972, he was a member of The Tonight Show Orchestra led by Skitch Henderson, then by Doc Severinsen. He composed music for the TV documentary Two Childhoods, which was about Vice President Hubert Humphrey and writer James Baldwin, and won an Emmy Award for his work. In 1980, Mottola began performing with Frank Sinatra, often in duets, appearing at Carnegie Hall and the White House. He retired from the music business in 1988 but kept playing at home almost every day.

Discography

{{ external media | align = center | width = 230px | audio1 = You may hear Tony Mottola performing "Golden Wedding(La Cinquantaine)" by Jean Gabriel-Marie with the accordionist John Serry Sr. and the Joe Biviano Accordion and Rhythm Sextette in 1945 [https://archive.org/details/78_golden-wedding-la-cinquantaine_joe-biviano-his-accordion-and-rhythm-sextette_gbia0071954b/Golden+We+-+Joe+Biviano%2C+his+Accordion+and+Rhythm+Sextette.flac  Here on Archive.org]}}

As leader
 Let's Put Out the Lights (RCA Camden, 1956)
 Mr. Big: Tony Mottola...Guitar (Command, 1959)
 Roman Guitar (Command, 1960)
 String Band Strum-Along (Command, 1961)
 Folk Songs (Command, 1961)
 Tony Mottola a Napoli (Command, 1963)
 Tony Mottola and His Orchestra (Command, 1963)
 Romantic Guitar (Command, 1963)
 Sentimental Guitar (Command, 1964)
 Guitar....Paris (Command, 1964)
 Spanish Guitar (Command, 1965)
 Love Songs Mexico S.A. (Command, 1965)
 Guitar U.S.A. (Command, 1966)
 Amor Mexico (Command, 1966)
 Heart & Soul (Project 3, 1966)
 Lush, Latin & Lovely (Project 3, 1967)
 Love Songs from Mexico (Command, 1967)
 Roma Oggi/Rome Today (Project 3, 1968)
 Warm, Wild and Wonderful (Project 3, 1968)
 Joins the Guitar Underground (Project 3, 1969)
 Hawaii Five-O (Design, 1969)
 Close to You (Project 3, 1970)
 Tony Mottola's Guitar Factory (Project 3, 1970)
 Warm Feelings (Project 3, 1971)
 Two Guitars for Two in Love (Project 3, 1972)
 Superstar Guitar (Project 3, 1972)
 Tony Mottola and the Quad Guitars (Project 3, 1973)
 Holiday Guitars (Project 3, 1974)
 Tony Mottola and the Brass Menagerie (Project 3, 1974)
 I Only Have Eyes for You (Project 3, 1975)
 Goin' Out of My Head (Project 3, 1979)
 Stardust (Project 3, 1980)
 All the Way (Project 3, 1983)

As sidemanWith Ray Charles Spring Is Here (MGM, 1955)
 Rome Revisited (Command, 1962)
 Something Wonderful (Command, 1961)
 Young Lovers On-Broadway (Command, 1965)
 Memories of a Middle-Aged Movie Fan (ATCO, 1968)With Urbie Green Twenty-One Trombones (Project 3, 1967)
 Green Power (Project 3, 1971)
 Bein' Green (Project 3, 1972)
 Urbie Green's Big Beautiful Band (Project 3, 1974)With Dick Hyman Electrodynamics (Command, 1963)
 Fabulous (Command, 1963)
 Keyboard Kaleidoscope (Command, 1964)
 The Man from O.R.G.A.N. (Command, 1965)
 Happening! (Command, 1966)
 Concerto Electro (Command, 1970)
 Fantomfingers (Project 3, 1971)
 Traditional Jazz Piano (Project 3, 1973)With Enoch Light Pertinent Percussion Cha Cha's (Command, 1959)
 Provocative Percussion Vol. 2 (Command, 1960)
 Cancoes de Paises Distantes (Musidisc 1960)
 Far Away Places (Command, 1960)
 Vibrations (Command, 1962)
 Big Band Bossa Nova (Command, 1962)
 My Musical Coloring Book (Command, 1963)
 1963: the Year's Most Popular Themes (Command, 1963)
 Dimension 3 (Command, 1964)
 Discotheque: Dance Dance Dance (Command, 1964)
 Magnificent Movie Themes (Command, 1965)
 Film Fame (Project 3, 1967)
 Enoch Light's Action (Project 3, 1967)
 The Best of Hollywood Movie Hits '68-'69 (Project 3, 1968)
 12 Smash Hits (Project 3, 1968)
 Enoch Light and the Glittering Guitars (Project 3, 1969)
 The Best of the Movie Themes 1970 (Project 3, 1970)
 The Big Band Hits of the Thirties (Project 3, 1970)
 Big Band Hits of the 30's & 40's (Project 3, 1971)
 Big Hits of the 20's (Project 3, 1971)
 The Big Band Sound of the Thirties (Project 3, 1971)
 The Big Band Hits of the 40s & 50s (Project 3, 1973)
 Spanish Strings (Project 3, 1973)
 Future Sound Shock (Project 3, 1973)
 Big Hits of the Seventies Vol. 2 (Project 3, 1975)
 The Disco Disque (Project 3, 1975)With Charles Magnante Roman Spectacular (Grand Award, 1957)
 Roman Spectacular Vol. 2 (Grand Award, 1957)
 Percussion Italiano (Grand Award, 1961)With Joe Reisman Armen's Theme (RCA Victor, 1956)
 Door of Dreams (RCA Victor, 1957)
 Party Night at Joe's (RCA Victor, 1958)With Doc Severinsen Tempestuous Trumpet (Command, 1961)
 The Big Band's Back in Town (Command, 1962)
 Twin Trumpet Discotheque Au Go Go (Command, 1965)
 Command Performances (Command, 1966)
 Fever (Command, 1966)
 Live! (Command, 1966)
 The Great Arrival! (Command, 1969)
 Trumpets and Crumpets and Things (ABC 1973)With Frank Sinatra She Shot Me Down (Reprise, 1981)
 Sinatra 80th: Live in Concert (1995)
 Sinatra: Vegas (2006)
 Sinatra: New York (2009)
 Live at the Meadowlands (2009)
 Sinatra: London (2014)With others' Jan August, Cha Cha Charm (Mercury, 1959)
 Louie Bellson, Breakthrough! (Project 3, 1968)
 Bobby Byrne, The Jazzbone's Connected to the Trombone (Grand Award, 1959)
 Al Caiola, Guitars, Woodwinds & Bongos (United Artists, 1960)
 Al Caiola, Percussion and Guitars (Time, 1960)
 Dorothy Collins, Experiment Songs (Motivation, 1961)
 Ray Conniff, S Wonderful! (Columbia, 1956)
 Perry Como, Sing to Me, Mr. C. (RCA Victor, 1961)
 Frederick Fennell, Frederick Fennell Conducts Gershwin (Mercury, 1961)
 Robert De Cormier, Walking in the Sunshine (Command, 1967)
 Milton DeLugg, Add-A-Part Jazz (Columbia, 1956)
 The Free Design, Kites Are Fun (Project 3, 1967)
 Johnny Desmond, Blue Smoke (Columbia, 1960)
 Georgia Gibbs, Swinging with Her Nibs (Mercury, 1956)
 Jackie Gleason, Jackie Gleason Presents "Oooo!" (Capitol, 1957)
 Bobby Hackett, That Midnight Touch (Project 3, 1967)
 Richard Hayman, Harmonica Holiday (Mercury, 1961)
 Neal Hefti, Concert Miniatures (Vik, 1957)
 Frank Hunter, The Sound of Strings Vol. 2 (Medallion, 1960)
 Ralph Hunter, The Wild Wild West (RCA Victor, 1959)
 Burl Ives, Cheers (Decca, 1959)
 Don Lamond, Off Beat Percussion (Command, 1962)
 Yank Lawson, Ole Dixie (ABC-Paramount, 1965)
 Eddie Layton, Caravan (Mercury, 1959)
 Richard Maltby, Many Sided Maltby (Sesac, 1958)
 Richard Maltby, Ballads and Blues (Roulette, 1962)
 Johnny Mathis, Open Fire, Two Guitars (Columbia, 1959)
 Mitch Miller, Peace Sing-Along (Atlantic, 1970)
 Jelly Roll Morton, Dick Hyman, Transcriptions for Orchestra (Columbia, 1974)
 Bucky Pizzarelli, Playing Bix Beiderbecke & Bill Challis and Carl Kress & Dick McDonough (Monmouth Evergreen, 1974)
 Ruth Price, My Name Is Ruth Price...I Sing! (Kapp, 1955)
 John Serry Sr., Accordion Capers - Joe Biviano & His Rhythm Sextette (Sonora, 1946) Accordion Capers - Joe Biviano and His Rhythm Sextette on archive.org 
 Hymie Shertzer, All the King's Saxes (Disneyland, 1958)
 Roy Smeck, The Magic Ukulele of Roy Smeck Wizard of the Strings (ABC-Paramount, 1959)
 Lou Stein, Eight for Kicks Four for Laughs (Jubilee, 1956)
 Kirby Stone Four, Frank Loesser's Broadway Hit Guys & Dolls (Columbia, 1962)
 Sylvia Syms, Syms by Sinatra (Reprise, 1982)
 Cootie Williams, Cootie Williams in Hi-Fi'' (RCA Victor, 1958)

References

External links 
 [ Tony Mottola] at AllMusic
 
  Tony Mottola performing on records archived on archive.org

American jazz guitarists
American people of Italian descent
People from Kearny, New Jersey
1918 births
2004 deaths
20th-century American guitarists
The Tonight Show Band members
Varèse Sarabande Records artists
MGM Records artists
Burials at Gate of Heaven Cemetery (East Hanover, New Jersey)